Senai–Desaru Expressway, SDE  (Malay: Lebuhraya Senai–Desaru), is an expressway in Johor, Malaysia. It connects Senai in central Johor to Desaru in eastern Johor. With a new crossing over the Johor River, when opened on 10 June 2011, the expressway shortened travel time from Senai to Desaru from 2.5 hours to one hour.

The Kilometre Zero of the expressway is located at Senai Main Interchange at Senai.

History
The Johor Bahru–Kota Tinggi Highway (Federal Route 3) and Pengerang Highway (Federal Route 92) used to be the only gateway to Desaru, with a typical journey of 2.5 hours. Construction of the expressway began in 2005. The construction was led by Senai–Desaru Expressway Berhad with a main contractor, Ranhill Engineers & Constructors Sdn Bhd. Phase 1 of the expressway linking Senai to Pasir Gudang was opened to traffic on 10 September 2009, and the remaining stretch from Pasir Gudang to Desaru, including the bridge, opened on 10 June 2011.

On 12 December 2017, former Works Minister Fadillah Yusof had announced that the government approved to allocate RM390 million to upgrade and expand the 26 km stretch from Cahaya Baru to the Bandar Penawar intersection into dual carriageway. However, a session was held on 17 July 2018 between the current Finance Ministry, the Works Ministry and the Economic Planning Unit to identify the list of Works Ministry projects that had not been issued acceptance letters, as well as the project savings. Following this session, Johor's State Public Works, Infrastructure and Transportation Committee chairman Mazlan Bujang said the federal government had postponed this project indefinitely on 9 December 2018.

Features

The tolled expressway is a combination of a four-lane dual carriageway (Senai–Cahaya Baru section) and a two-lane single carriageway (Cahaya Baru–Penawar section), which improves road connection between western and eastern Johor. It features a closed toll system like the North–South Expressway. It is also an alternative route to Desaru Beach, instead of Federal Routes 3 and 92 from Johor Bahru and Singapore. The highway has become the main access road to Desaru from North–South Expressway Southern Route E2 and a major road link to Senai International Airport from Kota Tinggi and eastern parts of Johor. Construction of the road included the 1.7 kilometre Sungai Johor-SDE Bridge, the longest single plane cable stayed bridge in Malaysia across Johor River, which became the longest river bridge in Malaysia after Batang Sadong Bridge in Sarawak.

The section between Cahaya Baru and Penawar is built as a two-lane expressway (except the Sungai Johor-SDE bridge) while retaining the full access control, making the section as the first true two-lane expressway with full access control in Malaysia.

There is a water catchment area located along Sungai Layang sections near the Sultan Iskandar Reservoir. Senai–Desaru Expressway traverses through the environmentally sensitive water catchment area of Sultan Iskandar Reservoir. Senai–Desaru Expressway is the only expressway in Malaysia which features the Pollutant Removal System (PRS). The expressway took one step higher by introducing the PRS to monitor and control any potential impact to the water quality in Sultan Iskandar Reservoir in the event of a spillage of dangerous and hazardous chemicals from any vehicle travelling on the expressway.

Toll systems
The Senai–Desaru Expressway is using the closed toll system. Beginning 9 November 2016, all electronic toll transactions has now conducted using Touch 'n Go and SmartTAGs.

Toll rates

List of interchanges

Main Link

Pasir Gudang Link

References

External links

Senai-Desaru Expressway Berhad (SDEB)
Longest cable-stayed bridge planned (The Star, 18 December 2006)

2009 establishments in Malaysia
 
Expressways and highways in Johor